Dina Aschehoug (12 April 1861 – 17 November 1956) was a Norwegian painter.

Biography
Dina Engel Laurentse Aschehoug  was born at Rakkestad  in Østfold county, Norway. She was the daughter of  Karen Margitte Danielsen (1834- 1904) and  Thorkild Johansen Aschehoug (1830-1902). Her father was a parish priest and brother-in-law of Torkel Halvorsen Aschehoug. 

She studied at Vilhelm Kyhn's drawing school in Copenhagen between 1880 and 1882, and then became a student of Eilif Peterssen and Erik Werenskiold in Kristiania (now Oslo). She later studied at the Académie Colarossi in Paris and at the Art Academy School for Women (Kunstakademiets Kunstskole for Kvinder) in Copenhagen. In accordance with her parents wishes, she sought employment as a teacher because her father thought the art was an insecure way of life. For  twenty years, she was a teacher at Sylow's School for Girls and the Women's Industrial School in Christiania (Statens lærerhøgskole i forming). In the years between 1911 and 1924 she lived in Copenhagen.

Works
Dina Aschehoug painted in particular interiors and portraits, and she created several altarpieces for Norwegian churches. In 1886, she painted the altarpiece of Rakkestad Church  in Østfold and in 1889  she delivered the altarpiece to Hedenstad Church in Lågendalen. In 1897, her painting of  Karen Stabell  was entered at the General Art and Industrial Exposition of Stockholm (Stockholmsutstillingen 1897). In 1906 she painted an altarpiece  for Komnes Church in Kongsberg. The altarpiece was subsequently moved to the nearby Efteløt Church.

References

1861 births
1956 deaths
People from Rakkestad
Académie Colarossi alumni
Norwegian women painters
19th-century Norwegian women artists
20th-century Norwegian women artists
19th-century Norwegian painters
20th-century Norwegian painters